The Sarmiento Formation (Spanish: Formación Sarmiento), in older literature described as the Casamayor Formation, is a geological formation in Chubut Province, Argentina, in central Patagonia, which spans around 30 million years from the mid-Eocene to the early Miocene. It predominantly consists of pyroclastic deposits, which were deposited in a semi-arid environment. It is divided up into a number of members. The diverse fauna of the Sarmiento Formation, including a variety of birds, crocodilians, turtles and snakes, also includes many mammals such as South American native ungulates (notoungulates, litopterns, astrapotheres) as well as armadillos, and caviomorph rodents.

Paleofauna

Amphibians

Birds

Reptiles

Crocodylomorphs

Lepidosaurs

Testudines

Mammals

Meridiolestidans

Meridiungulates

Xenarthrans

Metatherians

Rodents

Primates

Bats

References 

 
Geologic formations of Argentina
Miocene Series of South America
Oligocene Series of South America
Eocene Series of South America
Paleogene Argentina
Neogene Argentina
Casamayoran
 
Divisaderan
Tinguirirican
Deseadan
Colhuehuapian
Fossiliferous stratigraphic units of South America
Paleontology in Argentina
Sandstone formations
Mudstone formations
Lacustrine deposits
Geology of Chubut Province
Golfo San Jorge Basin
Tuff formations